Seydewitz is a surname of:

 Carl Christian Seydewitz (1777–1857), German-Danish portrait painter and officer

 Ernst von Seydewitz (1852–1929), Saxon politician and saxon finance minister
 Max Seydewitz (1892–1987), German politician (SPD, SAPD and SED)
 Otto von Seydewitz (1818–1898), Prussian politician, member of Reichstag

Surnames
Surnames of German origin